Folsomia regularis is a species of elongate-bodied springtails in the family Isotomidae.

References

Collembola
Articles created by Qbugbot
Animals described in 1953